Benabdelmalek Ramdane (also Ben Abdelmalek Ramdan) is a town and commune in Mostaganem Province, Algeria. It is located in Sidi Lakhdar District. According to the 1998 census it has a population of 12,577.

References

Communes of Mostaganem Province